Alexander Lebenstein (November 3, 1927 – 28 January 2010) was a German-American Holocaust survivor. He was the sole surviving Jew in the Shoah from Haltern am See. The Alexander-Lebenstein junior high school in his hometown is named after him.

Life

Childhood 
He was born on November 3, 1927, at the family home Disselhof 36 in Haltern and experienced in his own words, a sheltered childhood until age 11. His mother, Lottie Joseph from Jever, Oldenburg, and his father, Nathan Lebenstein, operated cattle trade and kosher and non-kosher butcher shop. His father had served in World War I for the German army. Alexander had three older sisters; one of them died in 1932, the other two emigrated in 1939 in the United States.

National Socialism 
During Kristallnacht in 1938 his family was hiding; shortly after Lebenstein and his family were brought to a Jewish house in Haltern. In January 1942 they came to the warehouse (former exhibition hall on the "Wildenbruchplatz") to Gelsenkirchen. From there they were deported to Riga, where his father fell seriously ill and was soon killed by SS troops.

In spring of 1942 he became separated from his mother and shipped to Lithuania. When he returned in the fall, his mother was gone. After the war, he found out that she had been shot in a forest near Riga, and was buried. After that Lebenstein was in several labor camps and was finally brought with a ferry to the Stutthof concentration camp in Gdańsk.

When in 1945 the Russians liberated the camp, he was sent in a hospital in Gdańsk because of his bad health condition. He fled with two men via Frankfurt (Oder) to Berlin, because they refused to join the Red Army. They were not welcome even by the Americans because the Russians had been looking after them. This is why Lebenstein went back to his birthplace Haltern, where he was compelled to leave the city again. He was denied German citizenship and came to Deggendorf (Bavaria) in a DP camp.

Emigration to the USA 
There, everyone wanted to emigrate to Israel, but his sister (who had already emigrated in 1939) advised him to come to her to the United States. In January 1947 he came to Richmond, Virginia.

Here too, no one wanted anything to do with him, because it was said: "A boy who has survived several concentration camps – that does not exist!". For this reason he moved to New York where he opened a supermarket. He married in 1948 and had two sons.

Working memory
In 1994 Lebenstein flew back to Germany for the first time. Two students from Haltern had written him a letter saying that they just learned about the Holocaust in the classroom. After initially rejecting their offer, he was convinced by his family to come to his German hometown. This visit completely changed the life of Alexander Lebenstein and soon after he started publicly speaking – in churches, schools, libraries and at the Virginia Holocaust Museum – about his life and his terrible experiences. The cattle car in front of the Virginia Holocaust Museum is a place for quiet remembrance. Erwin Kirschenbaum, a German schoolmate of Lebenstein's provided the cattle car as part of a school project.

In order for his tireless memorial work to be continued even after death, he founded the “Alexander Lebenstein Fund for Tolerance and Human Rights".

On 9 November 2009, a documentary called "Kristallnacht and Beyond", was presented at the Virginia Holocaust Museum. This movie shows Alexander at one of his later visits to his hometown of Haltern am See.

Until his death on 28 January 2010, Lebenstein lived near Richmond, Virginia. He died at the age of 82 years in the same city.

Honours 

In 2003 he took over the sponsorship for the school in Haltern am See, now called the Alexander-Lebenstein-Junior-high-school.
On June 5, 2008, he was awarded for his engagement for the honorary citizenship of the city Haltern am See.
In 2009 the Virginia Center for Inclusive Communities recognized Lebenstein with the Richmond Chapter Humanitarian Award.

Foundation 
The Alexander-Lebenstein-school was considered in the estate of its namesake with $30,000. Together with donations and grants that money was transferred (as earmarked named funds) within the Community Foundation "Halterns for Halterns." Its purpose is the promotion "of particularly sustained, long-term projects, activities and initiatives that contribute to overcome discrimination and racism, recurring project days to commemorate the events of the Holocaust, initiatives that contribute to the understanding of all people and cultures and promote awareness of tolerance, a life of mutual respect and dignity.

The Alexander Lebenstein Fund for Tolerance and Human Rights was established at the Richmond Jewish Foundation in 2010. This fund supports special opportunities that enhances the practice of tolerance, appreciation for diversity and embrace human rights. Grants will be available to support the following: For purchase of resources such as books or classrooms or workshops; for fees of speakers discussing in a charitable, educational or religious setting, tolerance, human rights and/or diversity; or; for such other programs, services or activities as may be in furtherance of the fund’s purpose.

Literature 
 With the help of the author Don Alexander Levin, Alexander Lebenstein published in 2008 his autobiography under the title The Gazebo in the USA.,

References

External links 
 Projekt der Alexander-Lebenstein-Realschule
 Lebenslauf Alexander Lebenstein (deutsch und englisch)
 Interview mit Alexander Lebenstein durch den Gedenkdienst, 2001
 Ausstellungshalle Wildenbruchplatz in Gelsenkirchen

 

Stutthof concentration camp survivors
20th-century German Jews
German emigrants to the United States
1927 births
2010 deaths
People from Haltern